Johannes Cornelis "Co" Verdaas (born 5 August 1966, in Breda) is a Dutch politician of the Labour Party (Partij van de Arbeid). He served as State Secretary for the Ministry of Economic Affairs, dealing with agriculture, nature, food quality, tourism and postal affairs in the Cabinet Rutte II from 5 November 2012  until his resignation on 6 December 2012. He previously served as a Member of the House of Representatives from 30 January 2003 until 29 November 2006, and as a member of the Provincial Executive (Gedeputeerde Staten) of the province of Gelderland from 2007 to 2012. Due to doubtful traffic expenses in his capacity of last one, he stepped down as a State Secretary.

Verdaas studied urban planning at Radboud University Nijmegen. Het developed the so-called Ladder of Verdaas, a system for solving traffic problems. Besides he is singer and guitarist in the rock band John-Boy & The Waltons.

References 
  Parlement.com biography

 

1966 births
Living people
Dutch civil servants
Dutch consultants
Dutch rock guitarists
Dutch male guitarists
Dutch rock singers
Dutch urban planners
Labour Party (Netherlands) politicians
Members of the House of Representatives (Netherlands)
Members of the Provincial-Executive of Gelderland
Members of the Provincial Council of Gelderland
People from Breda
People from Zwolle
Radboud University Nijmegen alumni
Academic staff of Radboud University Nijmegen
State Secretaries for Economic Affairs of the Netherlands
Academic staff of Utrecht University